Allan F. Nicholls (born April 8, 1945) is a Canadian actor, film director, film producer, screenwriter, composer and musician.  He was nominated for both a BAFTA and WGA award for his writing on the 1978 film A Wedding. He is often credited as Allan Nicholls.
Allan was lead vocalist in the mid-60s with recording acts J.B. & The Playboys (RCA), who later became The Jaybees (on RCA) then Carnival Connection (Capitol). After playing Claude in the musical "Hair" he returned to Montreal to briefly sing lead vocals with Mashmakhan before releasing a number of solo recordings (with some charting in Canada) before delving into a career with the movie industry. A "J.B. & The Playboys – Anthology" CD was released by Super Oldies in 2005. He is probably most well known to the general public for his role as team captain Johnny Upton in the movie Slap Shot.

Personal life
Nicholls's grandfather was goaltender Riley Hern, who played for the Montreal Wanderers. The Wanderers won the Stanley Cup with Hern in goal in 1908, 1909 and 1911.

Selected filmography as an actor

Filmography as a writer
A Wedding (1978)
A Perfect Couple (1979)

Filmography as a director
Dead Ringer (1981)
I Am a Hotel (1983)

Filmography as a composer
Nashville (1975)
A Perfect Couple (1979)

References

External links
 
 
   Memorabilia from Allan's music career

1945 births
Living people
20th-century Canadian composers
Canadian male film actors
Canadian male composers
Canadian male screenwriters
Film directors from Montreal
Male actors from Montreal
Musicians from Montreal
Writers from Montreal
20th-century Canadian male musicians
20th-century Canadian screenwriters
20th-century Canadian male writers
21st-century Canadian screenwriters
21st-century Canadian male writers